Up the Sandbox is a 1972 American comedy-drama film directed by Irvin Kershner and starring Barbra Streisand.

Paul Zindel's screenplay, based on the novel by Anne Roiphe, focuses on Margaret Reynolds, a bored, young wife and mother who slips into increasingly bizarre fantasies.

The cast includes David Selby, Paul Benedict, George S. Irving, Conrad Bain, Isabel Sanford, Lois Smith, Jacobo Morales playing a character who closely resembles Fidel Castro, and Stockard Channing in her film debut.

Plot
Margaret Reynolds, a young wife and mother of two, severely bored with her day-to-day life in New York City and neglected by her husband Paul (David Selby), discovers that she is pregnant again. She does not tell her husband at first, and instead she finds refuge in her outrageous fantasies: being sexually pursued by a Central American dictator modeled on Fidel Castro, imagined confrontations with her husband and mother, an anthropological visit to an African tribe that promises a ritual of pain-free childbirth, and a terrorist mission to plant explosives in the Statue of Liberty. After one final fantasy of first visiting and then fleeing an abortion clinic, Margaret finally tells Paul about the pregnancy and then leaves in a taxi to enjoy a day without parenting responsibilities.

Cast
Barbra Streisand as Margaret Reynolds
David Selby as Paul Reynolds
Ariane Heller as Elizabeth Reynolds
Jane Hoffman as Mrs. Koerner
John C. Becher as Mr. Koerner
Jacobo Morales as Fidel Castro
Paul Benedict as Dr. Beineke
George S. Irving as Dr. Keglin
Conrad Bain as Dr. Gordon
Isabel Sanford as Maria
Paul Dooley as Statue of Liberty Guard
Anne Ramsey as Battleaxe 
Lois Smith as Elinore
Lee Chamberlin as Jan
Jennifer Darling as Joanne
Marilyn Coleman as Rose White
Stockard Channing (uncredited) as Judy Stanley

Production
Director Irvin Kershner reportedly told Barbra Streisand's biographer James Spada that he was originally unhappy with the script and that he was advised not to express his dissatisfaction to Streisand. Several days into filming, when Streisand went to Kershner and asked him why they were having so much trouble, he told her that they had started shooting with a weak script. Kershner said "Your people warned me not to tell you." Streisand said "That's ridiculous! If a script isn't good enough, let's work to improve it."

Kershner originally planned to shoot on a backlot at MGM. When Streisand convinced him it would be better for the film to shoot some scenes on location in East Africa, he agreed and then convinced producers Robert Chartoff and Irwin Winkler. Kershner used Samburu tribesmen as extras, portraying the fabled Masai tribe.

Streisand remembered Kenya as "quite beautiful...I remember it being so hot. We had no air conditioner or anything, so I had a little, dinky trailer filled with flies. Flies everywhere. But I loved the people, the Samburu people, and I made very good friends with a woman of the tribe. We didn’t speak the same language, obviously, but she understood what I was trying to say to her. She showed me how to dress. Everything was held together with safety pins so nobody had to sew anything. I had the greatest outfits. You rip the fabric and you safety pin in where you want it. And then jewelry made out of telephone wires, little beads. She taught me how they put makeup on their eyes with the ground stone, blue..."

Kershner's hopes of working with Streisand again were stymied when she rejected the title role in Eyes of Laura Mars; Faye Dunaway eventually took the part.

Reception
Up the Sandbox was one of the first films to explore women's changing roles during the sexual revolution of the early 1970s, and critics praised Streisand's performance. According to Pauline Kael, Streisand "never seemed so radiant as in this joyful mess, taken from the Anne Richardson Roiphe novel and directed by Irvin Kershner. The picture is full of knockabout urban humor".

Roger Ebert, who gave the film three out of four stars, only had praise for her in his review: "This is a Barbra Streisand movie, and so we know the central character won't (can't) be stereotyped; nothing even remotely like Streisand has existed in movies before...She does not give us a liberated woman, or even a woman working in some organized way toward liberation. Instead, she gives us a woman who feels free to be herself, no matter what anyone thinks. This is a kind of woman, come to think of it, who is rare in American movies".

Audiences avoided Up the Sandbox, and it proved to be one of Streisand's lower-grossing films.

Home media
Up the Sandbox was released in a Region 1 DVD on October 5, 2004 as a part of the Barbra Streisand Collection.

See also
 List of American films of 1972

References

External links
 
 
 

1972 films
1972 comedy-drama films
1970s English-language films
Films directed by Irvin Kershner
Films produced by Robert Chartoff
Films produced by Irwin Winkler
Films scored by Billy Goldenberg
Films shot in Kenya
Films set in New York City
First Artists films
Barwood Films films
American comedy-drama films
Films based on American novels
1970s American films